George Washington Rice (November 7, 1823 – August 4, 1856) was an American businessman known for founding the Massachusetts Mutual Life Insurance Company and the Springfield 5 Cent Savings Bank.

Early life 
George Washington Rice was born on November 7, 1823 at Springfield, Massachusetts to John and Joanna Warriner Rice. His paternal grandfather was a Revolutionary War veteran. His uncle, William Rice was a member of the Massachusetts House of Representatives. Jerusha was a daughter of David Warriner of Wilbraham, Massachusetts.

Family and genealogy 
G.W. Rice married Jane C. Marsh on April 11, 1849 in West Springfield, Massachusetts. Children of George and Jane Rice were George W. Rice, Jr. (1853–1933), Katherine Rice (born 1855) and Ada Rice (born 1856).

Rice was a direct descendant of Edmund Rice an early immigrant to Massachusetts Bay Colony as follows:

 George Washington Rice, son of
 John Rice (1782–1841), son of
 Nathan Rice (1760–1838), son of
 John Rice (1704–1771), son of
 Ephraim Rice (1665–1732), son of
 Thomas Rice (1626–1681), son of
 Edmund Rice (c. 1594–1663)

Death 
George Washington Rice died on August 4, 1856 in Springfield, MA.

Notes 

1823 births
1856 deaths
Businesspeople from Springfield, Massachusetts
American businesspeople in insurance
19th-century American businesspeople